The 2000 Direct Line International Championships was a women's tennis tournament played on outdoor grass courts at the Eastbourne Tennis Centre in Eastbourne in the United Kingdom that was part of Tier II of the 2000 WTA Tour. The tournament was held from 19 June until 24 June 2000. Sixth-seeded Julie Halard-Decugis won the singles title.

Finals

Singles

 Julie Halard-Decugis defeated  Dominique Van Roost 7–6(7–4), 6–4
 It was Halard-Decugis' 1st singles title of the year and the 11th of her career.

Doubles

 Ai Sugiyama /  Nathalie Tauziat defeated  Lisa Raymond /  Rennae Stubbs 2–6, 6–3, 7–6(7–3)
 It was Sugiyama's 3rd doubles title of the year and the 13th of her career. It was Tauziat's 1st doubles title of the year and the 20th of her career.

References

External links
 ITF tournament edition details

Direct Line International Championships
Eastbourne International
June 2000 sports events in the United Kingdom
2000 in English women's sport
2000 in English tennis